Cumberland Community Unit School District 77 is a unified school district located in the county seat of Cumberland County, the village of Toledo, Illinois. It is composed of three schools: one elementary school, one junior high school, and one high school, and altogether, as of the 2007–08 school year, encompasses 1,132 students. Students just entering the district first attend Cumberland Elementary School, which serves students from kindergarten through grade five; the school also runs a pre-kindergarten program, and is headed by T. Butler. Those in grades six through eight attend Cumberland Junior High School, which is headed by principal Kevin Maynard. Graduates spend their last years in the district at Cumberland High School, from grade nine through grade twelve. The principal of Cumberland High School is Todd Hall. The superintendent of the district is Todd Butler; the nickname of the district junior high school is the Raiders, while the nickname of the high school is the Pirates.

The district high school runs a series of clubs that range from a branch of the FFA and one that pressed towards environmental awareness to a National Honor Society, a varsity Scholastic Bowl team, and a woodworking club known as "Splinter Group." The middle school's activities are more limited; Cumberland Junior High School encompasses a school band, a chorus program, a student council, a junior varsity Scholastic Bowl team, and an ecology study group.

As of 2006 ISAT testing results, students of the district in grades three through eight and students in grade eleven passed with an average that more or less hovered around the statewide average score for said tests.

References

External links 
 

Education in Cumberland County, Illinois
School districts in Illinois